The 2015 Carolina Challenge Cup was the 12th staging of the tournament. The tournament ran between February 21-28.

The defending champions, D.C. United, did not participate in the 2015 edition of the tournament (due to their participation in the 2014–15 CONCACAF Champions League), though Houston Dynamo remained along with hosts Charleston Battery. The remaining two places were filled with MLS newcomers New York City FC and Orlando City SC.

Teams

Standings

Matches

See also 
 Carolina Challenge Cup
 Charleston Battery
 2015 in American soccer

References 

2015
2015 in American soccer
Carolina Challenge Cup
February 2015 sports events in the United States